Herman Frederik Carel, or Herman ten Kate, the Elder (16 February 1822 – 26 March 1891) was a Dutch artist known for his paintings, drawings, and prints. He was notable as a teacher, and renowned for his watercolours and paintings of historical genre with emphasis on military figures. His contemporary artists who also followed on the same genre of paintings were David Bles, Alexander Hugo Bakker Korff and Charles Rochussen. He received royal patronage under King William III of the Netherlands.

Early life
He was born in The Hague on 16 February 1822, the son of Jan Herman ten Kate (1789–1860), and Johanna Henriette Adriana de Witte van Haemstede (1792–1858). He was a student of Cornelis Kruseman from 1837 and 1841. After his education he traveled to Belgium, Germany, Italy and France, during 1841–42. In Paris, Jean-Louis Ernest Meissonier advised him on his painting. On his return from his travels, he studied in the Municipal Academy (1842) and at the Royal Academy of Art (1841–42).

Career

His career started in 1837. Some of Ten Kate's paintings, which were very popular with the public, depicted interior scenes of guard rooms with Spanish or Dutch soldiers in uniform. His colouring was rich, and his brushwork was careful. Ten Kate's paintings were exhibited in the museums in The Hague (1867, 1869), Belgium, Germany, Italy, France (1840-1841), Amsterdam (1868), and Haarlem. He was Director of The Academy of Arts (1860s). During wartime, there was a decline in the sale of his military themed art work so he shifted his emphasis to landscape paintings. His art work titled  sold in June 1870 but his next painting didn't sell until February 1872.

Personal life
His son, Herman F.C. ten Kate, the younger, was an anthropologist who co-authored a paper on the skulls of decapitated criminals. His younger brother, Mari ten Kate (1831–1910), also an artist, was more influenced by the Romanticists and freer in handling. Ten Kate died in 1891.

Gallery

References

External links
Herman Frederik Carel Ten Kate paintings Art UK

1822 births
1891 deaths
Dutch male painters
Dutch stamp designers
Artists from The Hague
19th-century Dutch painters
19th-century Dutch male artists